Fei-Fei, Feifei, or Fei Fei may refer to the following people:

Fei-Fei Li (born 1976), an American computer scientist
Fei Fei Sun (born 1989), a Chinese model based in New York City
Feifei Sun (born 1981), a Chinese actress
Feifei Sui (born 1979), a Chinese basketball player
Feifei Fan (born 1989), a Chinese goalball player
Lydia Shum (1945–2008), aka "Fei-Fei", a Hong Kong comedian, MC, actress, & singer
Fei Fei, a fictional character in the 2020 computer-animated film Over the Moon voiced by Cathy Ang